Fort Pyl ( Peyil Balakotuwa) or Fort Pass Pyl (Peyil Pas Balakotuwa) was a small fort in the Elephant Pass Fort areas, which is narrow part of the Jaffna peninsula. The fort was located in line with two other forts, Elephant Pass fort and Fort Beschutter, in order to protect Jaffna peninsula from attacks originating from the mainland.

The square-shaped fort built as similar to Elephant Pass fort and Fort Beschutter. It was destroyed and no evidence of the fort is visible today.

References

External links 
 Fort Pyl & Fort Beschutter

Pyl
Pyl